Todd Wharton (born February 8, 1994) is an American former soccer player.

Career

Youth and College
Wharton played four years of college soccer at the University of Virginia between 2012 and 2015. During his stay at Virginia, Wharton was part of the team that won the 2014 NCAA National Championship.

Wharton also appeared for National Premier Soccer League side RVA FC in 2013 and Premier Development League side Portland Timbers U23s in 2015.

Professional
On January 13, 2016, Wharton signed a contract with Major League Soccer ahead of the 2016 MLS SuperDraft, where he was expected to go early on in the draft. Surprisingly however, Wharton wasn't selected by any MLS team over the four rounds.

Wharton signed with United Soccer League side Rio Grande Valley FC on March 16, 2016. He made his professional debut on March 26, 2016 as a 66th-minute substitute during a 0–2 loss against Tulsa Roughnecks.

After three seasons with Rio Grande Valley, Wharton moved to Portland Timbers 2 on January 30, 2019.

On December 10, 2019, Wharton moved to USL Championship side Saint Louis FC. Saint Louis FC folded following the 2020 USL Championship season.

On February 19, 2021, Wharton signed with USL Championship side Pittsburgh Riverhounds.

On January 11, 2022, Wharton announced his retirement from professional soccer.

References

External links

Virginia Cavaliers bio

1994 births
American soccer players
Association football midfielders
Living people
National Premier Soccer League players
Pittsburgh Riverhounds SC players
Portland Timbers 2 players
Portland Timbers U23s players
Rio Grande Valley FC Toros players
RVA FC players
Saint Louis FC players
Soccer players from Richmond, Virginia
Sportspeople from Richmond, Virginia
USL Championship players
USL League Two players
Virginia Cavaliers men's soccer players